Irma la douce ("Irma the Sweet") is a 1956 French musical with music by Marguerite Monnot and lyrics and book by Alexandre Breffort. The musical premiered in Paris in 1956, and was subsequently produced in the West End in 1958 and on Broadway, by David Merrick, in 1960. The English lyrics and book (1958) are by Julian More, David Heneker, and Monty Norman.

Productions
The musical premiered in Paris at the Théâtre Gramont in Paris on November 12, 1956, where it ran for four years. It was produced in the West End at the Lyric Theatre, opening on July 17, 1958, running for 1,512 performances, for three years. The West End production was directed by Peter Brook with choreography by John Heawood, and starred Keith Michell as Nestor, a student, Elizabeth Seal as Irma, and Clive Revill as the barman/narrator.

Irma La Douce opened on Broadway at the Plymouth Theatre (now the Gerald Schoenfeld Theatre) on September 29, 1960, moved to the Alvin Theatre on October 30, 1961, and closed on December 31, 1961, after 524 performances. The production was directed by Peter Brook with choreography by Onna White. Repeating their roles from the London production were Michell, Seal, and Revill.  Stuart Damon and Fred Gwynne also were featured.

A Mexican version was produced in 1962, starring Mexican cinema superstar Silvia Pinal and actor Julio Alemán. The production was shown in the Teatro de los Insurgentes of Mexico City.

The story was adapted for a non-musical film of the same title in 1963, directed by Billy Wilder starring Jack Lemmon and Shirley MacLaine.

San Francisco's 42nd Street Moon presented a staged concert  from September 25 to October 12, 2008. Alison Ewing starred as Irma with Kyle Payne in the dual role of Nestor-Le-Fripé/Oscar and Bill Fahrner as Bob-Le-Hotu, the narrator. Greg MacKellan directed, and Linda Posner choreographed.

Plot
Irma La Douce is a successful prostitute, living in Paris. A poor law student, Nestor le Fripé, falls in love with her and is jealous of her clients. In order to keep her for himself, he assumes the disguise of a rich older man, "Oscar", and takes many jobs. Finally no longer able to sustain his exhausting life, he "kills" Oscar, is convicted of murder, and is transported to the Devil's Island penal colony. He escapes and returns to Paris, and proves that he is innocent. He and Irma reunite.

Songs (English version) 

Act I      
"Valse Milieu"—Bob-Le-Hotu 
"Sons of France"—The Mecs, Polyte-Le-Mou and Police Inspector 
"The Bridge of Caulaincourt"—Irma-La-Douce and Nestor-Le-Fripe 
"Our Language of Love"—Irma-La-Douce and Nestor-Le-Fripe 
"She's Got The Lot"—Police Inspector and Irma's Admirers 
"Our Language of Love (Reprise)"—Irma-La-Douce
"Dis-Donc"—Irma-La-Douce 
"Le Grisbi is le Root of le Evil in Man"—Bob-Le-Hotu, Nestor-Le-Fripe and the Mecs 
"Wreck of a Mec"—Nestor-Le-Fripe 
"That's a Crime"—Bob-Le-Hotu, Nestor-Le-Fripe and the Mecs

Act II      
"The Bridge of Caulaincourt (Reprise)"—Irma-La-Douce and Nestor-Le-Fripe 
"From a Prison Cell"—Nestor-Le-Fripe and the Mecs 
"Irma-la-Douce"—Irma-La-Douce 
"There Is Only One Paris for That"—Nestor-Le-Fripe, the Mecs and Prisoners 
"The Freedom of the Seas"—Nestor-Le-Fripe and the Mecs
"There Is Only One Paris for That (Reprise)"—Nestor-Le-Fripe and the Mecs 
"Our Language of Love (Reprise)"—Irma-La-Douce 
"But"—Nestor-Le-Fripe, Police Inspector, A Tax Inspector, M. Bougne and Polyte-Le-Mou 
"Christmas Child"—The Company

Response
Life Magazine called the musical "a French fairy tale for wicked grown-ups who want to believe in love" and praised Seal. "Elizabeth Seal is an ideal Irma, tender, breezy, and totally implausible as a bad girl...the season's new favorite." "Another asset is Clive Revill...who provides the right clowning touch."

Awards and nominations

Original Broadway production

References

External links

Internet Broadway Database
Plot and other information at guidetomusicaltheatre.com
Time Magazine review, October 10, 1960

Broadway musicals
1960 musicals
West End musicals
Original musicals
French musicals
Tony Award-winning musicals